Maureen Mwanawasa (née Kakubo; born  April 28, 1963) is a legal practitioner and was once a First Lady of Zambia from 2002 to 2008. She is also a member of the Association of Women Lawyers in the United Kingdom, a serving council member of Law Association of Zambia Women’s Rights Committee, and is the current Vice Chairperson for the Habitat for Humanity, Zambia Board. She is the current Patron of Breakthrough Cancer Trust and the Child Care & Adoption Society of Zambia.

Biography 
Maureen Kakubo Mwanawasa was born in Kabwe, in the Central Province of Zambia on April 28, 1963 to Jeniya Lupumpaula Chilunga Kakabo and Lupumpaula Buluwayo Kakubo. She was the eighth born in a family of 10 children (including a set of twins), 6 boys and 4 girls.

She started her school in 1970 at the age of seven at Raphael Kombe Primary School in Chimanimani Township in Kabwe. In 1976 she was accepted to go to St. Mary's Secondary School in Maramba, Livingstone, Southern Province of Zambia from form 1 until her compilation in 1981.

Mwanawasa met her future husband,  Levy Mwanawasa in Kabwe where they went on to get married on 7 May 1987. The couple have 4 children together, 3 girls and 1 boy.

She campaigned with her husband during his 2001 elections when run for the presidency of Zambia and won the elections held on 27 December 2001 and took office on 2nd January, 2022. 

As early as 2006, Mwanawasa was seen as a potential candidate for president of the country, but following her husband's death she did not file as a potential candidate to represent her husband's party in the election. She, however, did suddenly clash against Michael Sata of the Patriotic Front when he came to pay respects to her at her husband's funeral, resulting in Sata being forced off the premises.

She is the past president of the Organisation of African First Ladies against HIV/AIDS and founder of the Maureen Mwanawasa Community Initiative (MMCI) in 2002. She was also the joint owner of Mwanawasa & Company, her husband's law firm, until he entered into politics and left his private practice.
She was awarded the International Hope Award by World Vision in 2006.

Mwanawasa was a Jehovah's Witness, but in 2001 she was excommunicated for being actively involved in politics. She is currently a Baptist Christian.

Political career
In May 2016, Mwanawasa announced her candidacy for Executive Mayor of Lusaka under the sponsorship of the United Party for National Development (UPND) in the 2016 general election held on August 11, 2016. Mwanawasa, who filed her nomination papers on May 30, 2016, received the endorsements of former President and Vice President Guy Scott, as well as former MPs Sylvia Masebo and Obvious Mwaliteta. She pledged to curb the city's cholera outbreaks and water shortages if elected. Mwanawasa also promised to clean up the city's chronic garbage and litter problems by creating a now garbage collection system, saying "Everywhere you look around in Lusaka, there is garbage and this should change starting this week when we form government. There is no way our beautiful city can be floating on garbage...The levels of indiscriminate disposal of garbage in Lusaka city are alarming. When you are on the streets of Lusaka, you look west you see garbage, you look east you see garbage, you look north, it’s garbage, you look south it’s garbage. This is unacceptable. Would you like it if your house was filled with garbage and there is bad odour all around? The answer is no. We need to maintain our hygiene and stay healthy and fit. It is our duty to keep our city clean not only for us, but also for the people visiting our city and also for the future generations."

Mwanawasa placed second in the Lusaka mayoral election on August 11, losing to the Patriotic Front (PF) candidate, Wilson Kalumba. Kalumba won the election with 270,161 votes, while Mwanawasa came in second place with 150,807 votes.

Personal life
Maureen Mwanawasa is the widow of former President Levy Mwanawasa, who died in office in 2008 and is a mother of four (4) including Chipokota Mwanawasa a Zambian lawyer and entrepreneur.

References 

Living people
First Ladies of Zambia
Movement for Multi-Party Democracy politicians
People disfellowshipped by the Jehovah's Witnesses
1963 births
People from Kabwe District